Megalobulimus amandus is a species of air-breathing land snail, a terrestrial gastropod mollusc in the family Strophocheilidae.

Distribution
This species is endemic to Brazil.

References

amandus
Endemic fauna of Brazil
Gastropods described in 2012